Campanula glomerata, known by the common names clustered bellflower or Dane's blood, is a species of flowering plant in the genus Campanula, belonging to the family Campanulaceae. It is the county flower of Rutland, England.

Etymology
The etymology of this plant is quite intuitive: the genus Latin name (“campanula”), meaning  small bell, refers to the bell-shape of the flower, while the specific name (glomerata) refers to the tight grouping of the flowers at the top of the stem.

Description
The stem is simple, erect and shortly pubescent, basal leaves are petiolated, oval-lanceolate and lightly heart-shaped (cordate), while cauline leaves are lanceolate, sessile and amplexicaul. The inflorescence is formed by 15-20 sessile, actinomorphic and hermaphrodite single flowers of about 2 to 3 cm. They are in terminal racemes or in the axils of upper leaves, surrounded by an involucre of bracts. The corolla is campanulate and pubescent with five dark violet-blue or purplish-blue petals. Flowering period is from June to September.

Distribution and habitat
The species is native to the North Temperate Zone of Eurasia, from Britain to Japan. In Europe it is present almost everywhere except the extreme north. In North America the plant is naturalized.

This plant can be found in forests or dry grasslands, in scrub and open woodland, in grassy but not too wet places, in the edges of woods and along the margins of roads and trails.

Subspecies
According to WCSP, 15 subspecies are recognized:
Campanula glomerata subsp. glomerata - Europe to NW. China
Campanula glomerata subsp. cervicarioides (Schult.) Arcang. (1882) - S. Europe
Campanula glomerata subsp. serotina (Wettst.) O.Schwarz (1949) - S. Alps
Campanula glomerata subsp. farinosa (Rochel ex Besser) Kirschl. (1852) - Alps to E. Europe to Kazakhstan
Campanula glomerata subsp. elliptica (Kit. ex Schult.) Kirschl. (1851) - Carpathians to C. Italy and Serbia
Campanula glomerata subsp. subcapitata (Popov) Fed. (1973) - E. Carpathians
Campanula glomerata subsp. hispida (Witasek) Hayek (1930) - N. Balkan Pen. to Iran
Campanula glomerata subsp. caucasica (Trautv.) Ogan. (1995) - NE. Turkey to Caucasus
Campanula glomerata subsp. oblongifolia (K.Koch) Fed. (1972) - E. Turkey to NE. Iran
Campanula glomerata subsp. oblongifolioides (Galushko) Ogan. (1995) - Caucasus
Campanula glomerata subsp. symphytifolia (Albov) Ogan. (1995) - W. Transcaucasus
Campanula glomerata subsp. panjutinii (Kolak.) Victorov (2002) - W. Transcaucasus
Campanula glomerata subsp. krylovii Olonova (1999) - W. Siberia
Campanula glomerata subsp. daqingshanica D.Y.Hong & Y.Z.Zhao (1983) - Inner Mongolia
Campanula glomerata subsp. speciosa (Hornem. ex Spreng.) Domin (1936) - S. Siberia to Japan (Kyushu)

Cultivation
The plant is widely cultivated in gardens, with flowers in a range of colours including white, pink, blue and purple. Numerous cultivars have been developed for garden use, including 'Joan Elliott' (with large violet flowers) and the white-flowered 'Schneekrone'. The pale purple cluster-flowered 'Caroline' has also won the award.

Gallery

Synonyms
Campanula aggregata Willd. ex Schlecht. (1813) (synonym = C. glomerata subsp. glomerata)
Campanula cervicarioides Schultes in Roemer & Schultes (1819) (synonym = C. glomerata subsp. cervicarioide)
Campanula congesta Schultes in Roemer & Schultes (1819) (synonym = C. glomerata subsp. glomerata)
Campanula farinosa Andrz. in Besser (1821) ( synonym = C. glomerata subsp. farinosa)
Campanula glomerata subsp. aggregata (Willd.) Kirschleger (1851) (synonym = C. glomerata subsp. glomerata)
Campanula glomerata subsp. cephalotes (Fisch. ex Schrank) D.Y.Hong (1983) (synonym = C. glomerata subsp. speciosa)
Campanula glomerata subsp. congesta (Roemer & Schultes) Schubler & Martens (1834) ( synonym = C. glomerata subsp. glomerata)
Campanula glomerata var. aggregata (Willd.) Koch (1846) (synonym = C. glomerata subsp. glomerata)
Campanula glomerata var. congesta (Roemer & Schultes) Rouy (1908) (synonym = C. glomerata subsp. glomerata)
Campanula glomerata var. dahurica Fisch. ex Ker-Gawl. (1822) ( synonym = C. glomerata subsp. speciosa)
Campanula glomerata var. farinosa (Andrz.) Koch (1846) (synonym = C. glomerata subsp. farinosa)
Campanula glaucophylla Schlosser & Vukot. (1875) (synonym = C. glomerata subsp. farinosa)
Campanula speciosa Hornem. (1815) (synonym = C. glomerata subsp. speciosa)

References 

 Pignatti S. - Flora d'Italia – Edagricole – 1982, Vol. II, pag. 682

External links
 Biolib
 Campanula glomerata
 USDA Profile
 Missouri Botanical Garden
 Kew Plant List

glomerata
Flora of France
Flora of China
Flora of Denmark
Flora of Estonia
Flora of Germany
Flora of Greece
Flora of Iran
Flora of Iraq
Flora of Italy
Flora of Japan
Flora of Korea
Flora of Latvia
Flora of Lithuania
Flora of Mongolia
Flora of Russia
Flora of Spain
Flora of Turkey
Flora of the United Kingdom
Plants described in 1753
Taxa named by Carl Linnaeus